Curtis Pitts (December 9, 1915 – June 10, 2005) of Stillmore, Georgia,  was an American  designer of a series of popular aerobatic biplanes, known as the Pitts Special.

Career
Pitts grew up in Americus, Georgia and his first airplane was a Waco F.

He designed and built the S-1, specifically for aerobatics, in 1945.

He also designed the Pitts Samson, built in 1948 for aerobatic pilot Jess Bristow.  The Samson was destroyed in a mid-air collision around 1950.

The Smithsonian Institution's National Air and Space Museum in Washington, DC has called Pitts' 1943 design "revolutionary because of its small size, light weight, short wingspan and extreme agility".

Curtis Pitts died of complications from a heart valve replacement at his home in Homestead, Florida on June 10, 2005.

Pitts was inducted into the Georgia Aviation Hall of Fame in 1991, and the Air Show Hall of Fame in 2002.

In popular culture
In the 1980 aviation drama film Cloud Dancer Curtis Pitts appears in a brief scene, played by Woodrow Chambliss.

See also
 1943 in aviation

References

External links
 Budd Davisson's website - Source for Pitts information.
 Pitts Specials Formation Aeroabtic Team - A father and son Pitts team.  They fly formation aerobatics, as well as inverted formations.

1915 births
2005 deaths
20th-century American engineers